Robert Crockett "Daddy" Potts (August 16, 1898 – August 11, 1981) was an American football player.  He played professionally in the National Football League (NFL) for the Frankford Yellow Jackets in the 1926 NFL season. Potts won the 1926 NFL championship with the Yellow Jackets. Outside of the NFL, he played for the Millville Big Blue, a successful independent team out of New Jersey. In 1925 Rae and Millville (sometimes called the Haven-Villa of Winter Haven) played several pick-up games in Florida against the Tampa Cardinals, featuring Red Grange.

References

External links
 

1898 births
1981 deaths
American football tackles
Clemson Tigers football players
Frankford Yellow Jackets players
Millville Football & Athletic Club players
All-Southern college football players
People from Fort Mill, South Carolina
Players of American football from South Carolina
Burials in South Carolina